Hurst Bay is a small bay on the east side of The Naze, James Ross Island, Antarctica. Following hydrographic work in the area from HMS Endurance, 1981–82, it was named by the UK Antarctic Place-Names Committee after Commander William E. Hurst, Royal Navy, the ship's navigating officer.

References

Bays of James Ross Island